The Navy League of the United States, commonly referred to as the Navy League, is a national association with nearly 50,000 members who advocate for a strong, credible United States Navy, United States Marine Corps, United States Coast Guard and U.S. Merchant Marine.

It was founded in 1902, at the suggestion of Theodore Roosevelt. The Navy League describes itself as "a civilian organization dedicated to the education of our citizens, including our elected officials, and the support of the men and women of the sea services and their families."

Publications
Seapower magazine and the Almanac of Seapower are the official publications of the Navy League. Seapower is published monthly and focuses on maritime defense news. The Almanac of Seapower is published annually in January.

See also
Navy League Cadet Corps
United States Naval Sea Cadet Corps

References

External links
Official website of the Navy League of the United States

United States Navy support organizations
Organizations established in 1902
Magazine publishing companies of the United States
1902 establishments in the United States